Vodil (also spelled as Vuadil) is an urban-type settlement in Fergana Region, Uzbekistan. It is part of Fergana District. Its population was 17,551 people in 1989, and 16,200 in 2016.

References

Populated places in Fergana Region
Urban-type settlements in Uzbekistan